Kentucky Route 1638 is a state highway in Kentucky. The entire route is in Meade County.

Route description
KY 1638 starts in Brandenburg Station at a junction with KY 448. The only other major junctions are with KY 933 and KY 1238, the latter being in Lickskillet. The eastern terminus is in Fort Knox at a junction with US 31W and KY 868. The latter three state routes terminate at KY 1638.

Major intersections

References 

1638
1638